Interpol Investigates is an American docudrama television series which aired on National Geographic Channel. The program follows Interpol as its members search for the minute clues left behind by culprits.

Episodes

References

External links
 National Geographic Channel: Interpol Investigates Crime Scene Investigation (archived 2007-04-20)

2004 American television series debuts
2005 American television series endings
2000s American crime television series
National Geographic (American TV channel) original programming
Works about Interpol
Television series by New Dominion Pictures